Stink Blasters was a children's toy line manufactured by Morrison Entertainment Group and distributed in thirty-four countries. The toys were first released in the early 2000s, with Series 2 released in 2005 and unreleased prototype Series 3. The line consisted of 24 collectable action figures per each of the two series, which release unpleasant odors when squeezed.

Characteristics
The dolls are three-inch figures of "grungy" boy characters with cartoonishly grotesque faces. They feature a hard, small plastic body and a large, hollow rubber head. When the head is lightly squeezed, a small hole, usually located near the mouth, emits a stench. According to the producer, the dolls could be squeezed over 30,000 times before losing their scents.

MEG has never explicitly described what goes into making the scents, claiming to be afraid of knock off brands. According to the company, the scent formulas were about 95 percent polypropylene glycol, and 5 percent oils, food flavorings and extracts. The emission of toxic cyclohexanone and toluene from the toys was kept at levels much lower than established permissible exposure limits, so they are safe. The formulas were made in laboratories in the United States, while the toys were produced in China. MEG is also careful not to include materials that one could be allergic to in the toys.

When the toys were packaged, each came with a plastic "stink containment unit" with a clip to attach it to things for travel, and to avoid losing it. Stink Blasters also came with trading cards that went farther into their backstories, giving them a biography and details on favorite foods and archenemies. 

The toys were released with suggested price 4.99$, intended for kids to afford them with their own allowance money.

History 
The toys were first released in 31 countries outside of the United States. In United States, they were first introduced to Chicago in 2003 for test marketing and sold out in almost every major store. The toys were so successful, that it led to a nationwide rollout in February 2004.

These dolls were once a popular toy in the United States. After a few years, however, they slowly disappeared off the market, as the demand for them had slowly declined. They were re-released several years later in the United Kingdom, with some limited success, however, not nearly to the levels once had in America. They achieved some more success in places like Italy and Australia. Toy collectors try to find the rare toys, which have begun to fetch high prices. They can be found on online auctions, from places such as Europe, as they have nearly fallen into obscurity in the states.

Toys

Series One
Stench Bros.
 Garbage Truck Chuck
 Barfin' Ben
 Porta Potty Paul
 Tony Anchovy

Veggies
 Garlic Gus
 Broccoli Bill
 Cauliflower Carl
 Blue Cheese Charlie

Nature Crew
 Cow Pie Pete
 Skunk Punk
 Pig Boy
 Matty Manure

B.O. Boys
 B.O. Brian
 Toe Jam Jimmy
 Sweat Sox Sammy
 Rotten Egg Reggie

Breathers
 Dog Breath Danny
 Fish Mouth Fred
 Lizard Lips Lenny
 Monster Mouth

Gasser Guys
 The Master Blaster
 Burpin' Buddy
 Butt Breath Bob
 The Silent Gasser

Series Two
Breathers
 Toxic Tyler
 Spewy Huey

Stench Bros.
 Chill E. Dawg Joey
 Never Wash Nick

The Dukes
 The Duke of Puke
 Pizza Face Pat
 Oil Slick Rick
 Dude Boy Doug
 Clammy Cliff
 Dandy Doo Dave

Nature Crew
 Rankin' Ryan
 Wart Hog Henry

The Zoo Crew
 Rat Boy Rob
 Vinnie the Vulture
 Elephant Drop Eric
 Zoo Boy Zach
 Camel Mouth Chris
 Monkey Cage Mike

Veggies
 Jurassic Josh
 Rotten Onion Ollie

B.O. Boys
 Ear Wax Max
 Armpit Andy

Gasser Guys
 Fartasaurus Frank
 Billy Bob Booger

Series Three
A special Series III of Stink Blasters was produced for test markets, but never officially released. They contain only 12 figures, and it is believed by the few who know about them that the series was never actually finished and was given up on due to declining sales or impracticality of the series. In Series III each figure had its own accessory, which had a scent of its own. This series is widely unknown and not considered a part of the Stink Blasters continuity.  

The Band
This group revolved entirely around musicians, one of which was a girl, a first for the series. Skunk Punk, the apparent guitarist of the band, was used in Series I.  
 Smooth Sounding Sammy
 DD Drum Boy
 Sweet Lips Suzie
 Skunk Punk (previously appeared in Series I)
 G Tar Garry
 Agent Boy Arnie

Smellville's Finest 
This group focused entirely on the adults of Smellville, also a first for the series. 
 Principal Prickly
 Detective Ratzzo
 Poppa Anchovy
 Mayor Poochie
 Chef Grimee
 Coach Grunge

Scent Stars 
Scent Stars was a companion line of toys, featuring female dolls with pretty faces and pleasant scents (such as roses, bubble gum, and cinnamon). Vice president of MEG, Daniel Stenton has stated that girls, the target audience of the series, "would not be interested in nasty things", and that "nobody would want to buy a bad smelling female doll, as girls are not known for being grungy". First series consisted of 12 dolls (named Lizzy, Maggie, Olivia, Cindy, Kate, Cookie, Jordy, Trisha, Vanessa, Lily, BeeBee and Jamie), with smaller version of them released as "wearable Scent Stars". Designs of next 12 dolls for series 2 were proposed during release of series 1, and later in some countries a series consisting of 6 of them (Tess, Natalie, Jillian, Courtney, Lucy and Alyssa) was sold.

External links
 Photos of the toys: http://www.virtualtoychest.com/s/stinkblasters/stinkblasters.html

References

Toy characters
Action figures
2000s toys